The New West Partnership is set of agreements that economically integrate the Canadian provinces of Alberta, British Columbia, Saskatchewan and Manitoba. They were created on April 30, 2010.

It is composed of:
 the New West Partnership Trade Agreement (NWPTA)
 the New West Partnership International Cooperation Agreement
 the New West Partnership Innovation Agreement

Trade Agreement 
The New West Partnership Trade Agreement (NWPTA) is an internal trade agreement that seeks to integrate the economies of three provinces.  It is frequently characterized by supporters, critics, and the media as an extension of the pre-existing Trade, Investment and Labour Mobility Agreement (TILMA) between British Columbia and Alberta which was signed on 28 April 2006, and provides a virtual economic union between the two provinces.  However the provincial government of Saskatchewan under the Saskatchewan Party's Brad Wall has said that the NWPTA provides more equitable treatment for Saskatchewan's Crown corporations which was one of the main public complaints that prevented Saskatchewan from joining TILMA in 2007.

The press release describing the NWPTA's creations describes it as 

The New West Partnership Trade Agreement came into effect on July 1, 2010.  Alberta and British Columbia already complied with the terms of the agreement at the time of its creation.  Saskatchewan is supposed to fully implement the agreement by July 1, 2013. Manitoba joined the partnership on November 17, 2016.

See also
Canadian Agreement on Internal Trade
Canada Minister for Internal Trade

References 

Economic history of Canada
Free trade agreements
Economy of Alberta
Economy of British Columbia
Economy of Saskatchewan
Treaties concluded in 2010
Treaties entered into force in 2010
Treaties of Canada